Disputationes (full title: Disputationes de Controversiis Christianae Fidei adversus hujus temporis Haereticos), also referred to as De Controversiis or the Controversiae, is a work on dogmatics in three volumes by Robert Bellarmine.

The Disputationes has been described as "the definitive defence of papal power". After its publication, Bellarmine's Disputationes was regarded as the Catholic Church's foremost defence of its doctrine, and especially the papal power.

It was written while Bellarmine was lecturing at the Roman College, and was first published at Ingolstadt in three volumes (1586, 1588, 1593). This work was the earliest attempt to systematize the various controversies of the time, and made an immense impression throughout Europe, the strength of its arguments against Protestantism so acutely felt in Germany and England that special chairs were founded in order to provide replies to it. Thomas Hobbes, Theodore Beza, Conrad Vorstius and John Rainolds were among those who wrote counter-arguments against the work.

"The complete edition, reviewed and corrected by the author, which became the standard for all further editions, appeared in Venice in 1596."

Content 
The final edition of 1596 of the Controversiae contains a total of 17 controversies:

 The Word of God
 Christ
 The Pope
 Councils
 The Members of the Church
 The Church Suffering
 The Church Triumphant
 The Sacraments in General
 Baptism and Confirmation
 The Sacrament of Eucharist
 Penance
 Extreme Unction, Orders, and Matrimony
 The Grace of the First Man
 The Loss of Grace
 Grace and Free Choice
 Justification
 Good Works

Content of the original three volumes

Volume I 
The first volume treats of the Holy Scriptures, of Christ, and of the pope.

The third section discusses the Antichrist. Bellarmine gives in full the theory set forth by the Church Fathers, of a personal Antichrist to come just before the end of the world and to be accepted by the Jews and enthroned in the temple at Jerusalem—thus endeavoring to dispose of the Protestant exposition which saw in the pope the Antichrist.

The most important part of the work is contained in the five books regarding the pope. In these, after a speculative introduction on forms of government in general, holding monarchy to be relatively the best, Bellarmine says that a monarchical government and the related temporal power are necessary for the Church, to preserve unity and order in it.

Such power Bellarmine considers to have been established by the commission of Christ to Saint Peter. He then proceeds to demonstrate that this power has been transmitted to the successors of Peter, admitting that a heretical pope may be freely judged and deposed by the Church since by the very fact of his heresy he would cease to be pope, or even a member of the Church. The fourth section sets forth the pope as the supreme judge in matters of faith and morals, though making the concessions that the pope may err in questions of fact which may be known by ordinary human knowledge, and also when he speaks as a mere unofficial theologian. Bellarmine took in particular the example of Pope Honorius I, who had been anathemized by the Third Council of Constantinople as holding to monothelitism. He claimed that although monothelitism had been rightly condemned, Honorius was however orthodox as he had not really held these views, and that papal authority did not extend itself to the factual interpretation of what was to be found in Honorius or not."

Volume II 
This volume treats of the sacraments: sacraments in general: Baptism, Confirmation, Eucharist, Reconciliation, Extreme Unction, Holy Orders, and Holy Matrimony.

Volume III  
This volume is about divine grace, free will, justification, and good works.

Almost in the Index 

As much as Protestants disliked Bellarmine's theories, he was in fact moderate in his defence of papal power.

In 1590, Pope Sixtus V had, of his own initiative, placed the first volume on a new edition of the Index Librorum Prohibitorum for denying that the pope had direct temporal authority over the whole world. The entry concerning Bellarmine reads: "Roberti Bellarmini Disputationes de Controversiis Christianae fidei adversus huius temporis haereticos. Nisi prius ex superioribus regulis recognitae fuerint." However, Sixtus V died before he could promulgate the bull which would have made this new edition of the Index enter into force. The successor of Sixtus V, Urban VII, asked for an examination and after it was done Bellarmine was exonerated and the book removed from the Index. Bellarmine's reasoning was that though the pope is the vicar of Christ, since Christ did not exercise his temporal power, nor may the pope.

Translation into English

Though several books of this work have been translated into English in the past, only recently is it seeing its first complete translation project in full, in an English translation made by Ryan Grant. Several parts of the work have been translated, and the whole project will be resumed after the translation project of Theologia Moralis by Saint Alphonsus Liguori is completed.

In 2016, Kenneth Baker's translation of the first three controversies was published as Controversies of the Christian Faith.

References

Sources

Editions 

  Extract of Book II, Chapter 30 (published online with permission)
  Extract of Book IV, Chapters 6 & 7 (published online with permission).

External links 
In Latin

 
 
 

1586 books
1588 books
1593 books
Disputations
Jesuit publications
16th-century Catholicism
Religious belief and doctrine